John Neal may refer to: 

 John Neal (writer) (1793–1876), American writer, critic, and activist
 John R. Neal (1836–1889), American politician 
 John Randolph Neal Jr. (1876–1959), American lawyer
 John Neal (politician) (1889–1962), British judge and politician
 John Neal (Welsh footballer) (1899–1965), Welsh international footballer
 John Neal (cricketer) (1926–2012), English cricketer
 John Neal (footballer, born 1932) (1932–2014), English football player and manager
 John Neal (businessman), former CEO of QBE Insurance
 John Neal (footballer, born 1966), English football player for Millwall and Barnet

See also
 John Baldwin Neil (1842–1902), governor of Idaho Territory
 John Neale (disambiguation)
 John Neill (disambiguation)